The Grammy-nominated Downtown Blues is Steve Allee's second album. It contains music from the John Von Ohlen, Chuck Carter and Steve Allee Big Bands.

Players
Piano: Steve Allee
Organ: Steve Corn
Guitar: Royce Campbell
Bass: John Clayton and Bill Moring
Drums: John Von Ohlen
Vibes: Art Reiner or Claude Sifferlin
Timbales: Art Reiner
Congas: Michael McFarland
Voice: Rita Reed, Chuck Carter
Reeds: Tom Meyer, Mark Radway, Harry Miedema, Chuck Carter, Terry Cook
Trumpet: Larry Wiseman, David Herndon, Jim Edison, Rick Savage, Steve Robinett, Don Johnson, Larry McWilliams, Al Kiger, Al Hembd
Trombone: Flip Miller, Bruce Geske, Tim Riggins, Jared Rodin, Ed Cox, David Pavolka, Ken Kugler
Recording engineer: Jack Gilfoy, Mark Hood, John Lazott
Mastering: Alan Johnson, TRC Studios

Tracks
Showtime
A Walk Through Bombay
Downtown Blues
Friday's Waltz
Big George
It Could Happen to You
Cariba
Saturn's Dance
The Joint Is Jumpin'
Algeria
Burma
Danse of Siam

References

2001 albums
Jazz albums by American artists
Blues albums by American artists